The South American U-15 Championship, also known as the Campeonato Sudamericano Sub15, is a South American association football competition held every two years contested by male players under the age of 15 and is organized by CONMEBOL, the governing body for football in South America. The first edition was for under-16 age players.

Brazil is the most successful team with five titles.

Results

Performances by countries

See also
South American Under-17 Football Championship
South American Youth Football Championship

Notes and references

External links
CONMEBOL official website

 
Under-15 association football
CONMEBOL competitions
2004 establishments in South America
Recurring sporting events established in 2004
South American youth sports competitions